The list of ship launches in 1894 includes a chronological list of some ships launched in 1894.


References

Sources
 

1894
 
1894 in transport